Scott Patterson (born 21 January 1962) is an Australian film director and film editor.

Before moving towards directing and film producing, Patterson used to work for the Australian television production company, Ross Wood Productions. Patterson's debut feature film, A Wreck, A Tangle, received an Australian Film Institute Award nomination for 'Best Achievement in Sound' in 2000.  It also won an Awgie Award from the Australian Writers' Guild in the category 'Feature Film – Original'.

His films have been screened at the Cannes Film Festival and Venice Film Festival, making him one of only a few Australian film directors to have films screened at both of these festivals. His short film Lessons in the Language of Love was screened in the Un Certain Regard section at the 1995 Cannes Film Festival. He has also directed and produced commercials featuring Tina Turner and his 2001 short film Pact won the 'Premiere Award' at the Hamburg Short Film Festival.

Patterson's 2004 feature film, The Crop, received the prize for 'Best International Feature Film' at the New York International Film Festival in 2005.

Selected filmography

Director
 The Crop (2004) (feature film)
 The Birthday Party (2004) (short film)
 All Saints (2001–02) (TV series)
 Pact (2001) (short film)
 Shock Jock (2001) (TV series)
 Stingers (2000) (TV series)
 A Wreck, A Tangle (2000) (feature film)
 Fallen Angels (1997) (TV series)
 Eat My Shorts (1995) (TV series)
 Lessons in the Language of Love (1995) (short film)
 Hell's Half Hectare (1988) (short film)

References

External links

1962 births
Living people
Australian film directors
Australian film editors
Australian film producers
Australian screenwriters
People from New South Wales